Stenammini is a tribe of Myrmicine ants with 6 genera and 1 fossil genus. Many genera in this tribe are known to collect seeds.

Genera
Aphaenogaster Mayr, 1853
Goniomma Emery, 1895
Messor Forel, 1890
Novomessor Emery, 1915
Oxyopomyrmex André, 1881
†Paraphaenogaster Dlussky, 1981
Stenamma Westwood, 1839
Veromessor Forel, 1917

References

Myrmicinae
Ant tribes